Efe Binici (born 24 February 2001) is a Turkish professional footballer who plays as a midfielder for Turkish club Göztepe.

Career
Efe Binici is a youth product of the academies of Koçarlı Belediyespor, Aydınspor, and Göztepe. On 15 July 2017, he signed his first professional contract with Göztepe. Binici made his professional debut with Göztepe in a 5-1 Süper Lig win over Denizlispor on 12 September 2020.

International career
Binici is a youth international for Turkey, having represented the Turkey U19s.

References

External links

2001 births
People from Aydın
Living people
Turkish footballers
Turkey youth international footballers
Association football midfielders
Göztepe S.K. footballers
Nazilli Belediyespor footballers
Süper Lig players
TFF Second League players